Snap parliamentary elections were held in Ceylon in July 1960.

Background
The March 1960 election had left neither of Ceylon's two major parties with a majority, so another election was inevitable.

The Sri Lanka Freedom Party, which had been in disarray since the murder of its leader S.W.R.D. Bandaranaike the previous year, settled on his widow, Sirimavo, as its new leader.  She pledged to continue her husband's policies, notably the Sinhala Only Act, and to proceed with repatriation of the estate Tamils to India. However, she promised to reach a compromise with the Federal Party.

The United National Party, led by Dudley Senanayake, refused to compromise with the Federal Party.  It also differed with the SLFP over economic policy.  The SLFP called for a socialist program of nationalization of both private enterprises and religious schools; the UNP preferred to leave both in private hands.

Results
The SLFP obtained a bare majority, despite getting a lower share of the popular vote than the UNP, and Mrs. Bandaranaike became prime minister. This was the first time in history a woman led her party to victory in a general election and thus becoming Prime Minister.

References

 
 
 
 
 
 

 
Ceylon
1960 in Ceylon
July 1960 events in Asia
1960 07
1960